The Government of Tripura, also known as the State Government of Tripura, or locally as State Government, is the supreme governing authority of the Indian state of Tripura and its 8 districts. It consists of an executive, led by the Governor of Tripura, a judiciary and a legislative branch.

Like other states in India, the head of state of Tripura is the Governor, appointed by the President of India on the advice of the Central government. His or her post is largely ceremonial. The Chief Minister is the head of government and is vested with most of the executive powers. Agartala is the capital of Tripura, and houses the Vidhan Sabha (Legislative Assembly) and the secretariat. The Tripura High Court, located in Agartala, Tripura exercises the jurisdiction and powers in respect of cases arising in the State of Tripura.

The present Legislative Assembly of Tripura is unicameral, consisting of 60 Member of the Legislative Assembly (M.L.A). Its term is 5 years, unless sooner dissolved.

Cabinet

References